Jarran Kentrel Reed (born December 16, 1992) is an American football defensive end for the Seattle Seahawks of the National Football League (NFL). He played college football at Alabama, and was selected by the Seahawks in the second round of the 2016 NFL Draft.

Early years
Reed attended Goldsboro High School in Goldsboro, North Carolina and graduated in 2011. Due to poor grades, Reed was forced to attend Hargrave Military Academy for a year after he had graduated high school.

College career
Reed attended East Mississippi Community College in 2012 and 2013. Reed helped lead his team to a win in the NJCAA national championship during the 2013 season. In Reed's time with East Mississippi Community College he was credited with 100 career stops, including 10.5 tackles for loss. Prior to 2014, Reed transferred to the University of Alabama.

During his first year at Alabama, he played in all 14 games and made 13 starts. He recorded 55 tackles and one sack. Reed considered entering the 2015 NFL Draft but decided against it and returned to Alabama for his senior year. Reed played in all 15 games his senior season and helped lead his team to a CFP national champion victory. He recorded 57 tackles and one sack during his senior season.

Professional career

Seattle Seahawks
On April 29, 2016, Reed was drafted in the second round of the 2016 NFL Draft with the 49th overall selection by the Seattle Seahawks after the team traded their second-, and fourth-round picks (56th, and 124th overall) to the Chicago Bears in order to move up to #49 in order to select Reed. On May 5, 2016, Reed signed a 4-year deal worth $4.889 million overall with a $1.756 million bonus.

As a rookie in 2016, Reed played 15 games and finished the year with 34 tackles, 1.5 sacks, and three passes defended. He finished his second season in 2017 with 45 tackles, 1.5 sacks and 4 tackles for loss.

In 2018, Reed had a breakout year. He had a career-high 2 sacks in a Week 3 win over the Dallas Cowboys, then matched his production from the previous two years in just four games with another sack the following week. He finished the season with 5 sacks in his final 5 games, to bring his season total up to 10.5 sacks.

Reed was suspended the first six games of the 2019 season for a violation of the personal conduct policy for an incident from early 2017. After the Seahawks traded for Jadeveon Clowney, Reed changed his number to 91. Reed was reinstated from suspension on October 14, 2019, and was activated to the active roster prior to Week 7.

On March 16, 2020, Reed signed a two-year, $23 million contract extension with the Seahawks.
In Week 9 against the Buffalo Bills, Reed sacked quarterback Josh Allen 2.5 times during the 44–34 loss. In the Wild Card Round of the playoffs against the Los Angeles Rams, Reed sacked Jared Goff two times during the 30–20 loss. Reed was released after the season on March 26, 2021.

Kansas City Chiefs
Reed signed a one-year, $5 million deal with the Kansas City Chiefs on March 31, 2021, with performance incentives to increase his potential pay up to $7 million. He started all 17 games in 2021, recording 43 tackles, 2.5 sacks, and two forced fumbles.

Green Bay Packers
Reed signed a one-year, $3.25 million deal with the Green Bay Packers on March 23, 2022. The contract included incentives for Reed to increase his salary up to $4.5 million, and had void years to spread the cap charge of his $1.865 million signing bonus over the next four years.

Seattle Seahawks (second stint)
On March 16, 2023, Reed signed a two-year, $12.8 million contract to return to the Seahawks.

NFL career statistics

Regular season

Postseason

References

External links
Seattle Seahawks bio
Alabama Crimson Tide bio
East Mississippi Lions bio

1992 births
Living people
People from Goldsboro, North Carolina
Players of American football from North Carolina
American football defensive tackles
Hargrave Military Academy alumni
East Mississippi Lions football players
Alabama Crimson Tide football players
Seattle Seahawks players
Kansas City Chiefs players
Green Bay Packers players